The 2012 BNP Paribas Primrose Bordeaux was a professional tennis tournament played on clay courts. It was the fifth edition of the tournament which was part of the 2012 ATP Challenger Tour. It took place in Bordeaux, France between 14 and 20 May 2012.

Singles main draw entrants

Seeds

 1 Rankings are as of May 7, 2012.

Other entrants
The following players received wildcards into the singles main draw:
  Marc Gicquel
  Paul-Henri Mathieu
  Josselin Ouanna
  Florent Serra

The following players received entry as a special exempt into the singles main draw:
  Ruben Bemelmans
  Yang Tsung-hua

The following players received entry from the qualifying draw:
  Gastão Elias
  Teymuraz Gabashvili
  Pierre-Hugues Herbert
  Carlos Salamanca

Champions

Singles

 Martin Kližan def.  Teymuraz Gabashvili, 7–5, 6–3

Doubles

 Martin Kližan /  Igor Zelenay vs.  Olivier Charroin /  Jonathan Marray, 7–6(7–5), 4–6, [10–4]

External links
Official Website

BNP Paribas Primrose Bordeaux
BNP Paribas Primrose Bordeaux
2012 in French tennis